Leylines is the sixth studio album by American Appalachian band Rising Appalachia. The album was produced by George Henry, recorded over ten days in Marin County studio Panoramic House, and released on May 3, 2019. Leylines was ranked on the Billboard Top Heatseekers chart, peaking at No. 22 for the week ending May 18, 2019. Singer-songwriters Ani DiFranco and Trevor Hall, as well as jazz trumpeter Maurice Turner, are featured on the album.

Background
The single "Resilient" was released on May 1, 2018. and received favorable reviews from NPR Music and Rolling Stone. The "Resilient" video, which features dancers Quentin Robinson, Justin Conte, Lukas van der Fecht, and Amy Secada, was reviewed by Bob Boilen for NPR Music's  All Songs TV, and by Steph Castor for the June 2018 issue of Girl Guitar Magazine.

Critical reception
The theme of Leylines is interconnectedness. In an interview, Chloe Smith said that the word 'leylines'

The album was reviewed by George Graham in The Graham Album Review, who wrote:

Individual tracks
The song "Harmonize" was released early as a music video which was featured by Rolling Stone. The song "Cuckoo" was featured in Paste, the song "Sunny Days" was featured in Relix, and the song "Speak Out" was featured in Brooklyn Vegan. The final track "Resilient" is a full band version of the single first released in 2018 as a duo performance and music video.

Track listing

See also
Songlines

References

Citations

Works cited

Further reading

Rising Appalachia albums
2019 albums